Copelatus quadrisignatus is a species of diving beetle. It is part of the genus Copelatus in the subfamily Copelatinae of the family Dytiscidae. It was described by Régimbart in 1877.

References

quadrisignatus
Beetles described in 1877